Parhelophilus obsoletus  (Loew, 1863), the  Unadorned Bog Fly , is a fairly common species of syrphid fly observed across Canada and the northeastern and central United States. Hoverflies can remain nearly motionless in flight. The adults are also  known as flower flies for they are commonly found on flowers, from which they get both energy-giving nectar and protein-rich pollen. The larvae are unknown.

References

Eristalinae
Articles created by Qbugbot
Insects described in 1863
Taxa named by Hermann Loew
Hoverflies of North America